The 2020–21 NCAA Division II football season was the component of the 2020 college football season organized by the NCAA at the Division II level in the United States. Due to the COVID-19 pandemic, only a few games were played during the traditional fall season. For other teams that chose to play during the 2020–21 school year, the regular season began on February 27, 2021, and culminated on April 25.

The season concluded with the end of the regular season, as the playoffs and championship game were not held due to the pandemic.

Conference changes and new programs

Membership changes

Conference standings
Only four conferences (GLVC, G-MAC, Mountain East and SAC), plus independents (Barton and Erskine) decided to play the season, all of them decided to play a spring schedule. GAC, GLIAC, GNAC, Gulf South, Lone Star, MIAA, PSAC, RMAC and SIAC cancelled their football season, but some of their teams decided to play. It does not count games designated as exhibition/scrimmage, it counts only official games in school's statistics.

Super Region 1

Super Region 2

Super Region 3

Super Region 4

Conferences that did not play
The following conferences did not hold a football season in fall 2020 or spring 2021.
Central Intercollegiate Athletic Association – announced on October 2, 2020, that the football season would not be played.
Northeast-10 Conference – announced on January 13, 2021, that postponed fall sports would not be rescheduled for the spring.
Northern Sun Intercollegiate Conference – did not have a football season.

See also

2020 NCAA Division I FBS football season
2020–21 NCAA Division I FCS football season
2020–21 NCAA Division III football season
2020 NAIA football season

References